The Group for the European United Left was a left-wing political group with seats in the European Parliament between 1989 and 1993.

History
The Group for the European United Left (EUL) was formed on 25 July 1989.

It consisted of MEPs from the Danish Socialist People's Party, the Italian Communist Party, the United Left of Spain (including the Spanish Communist Party) and the Greek Synaspismós. It was later joined by the Democratic Left of Ireland's sole MEP.

EUL collapsed in January 1993 when the Italian Communist Party dissolved itself to establish the post-communist Democratic Party of the Left, with its MEPs leaving the EUL group to join the Party of European Socialists.

Sources
Development of Political Groups in the European Parliament
Europe Politique
Democracy in the European Parliament
European Parliament MEP Archives
Political Groups of the European Parliament
"European Union: Power and Policy-Making" second edition,

References

Former European Parliament party groups
Communist parties in Europe